Reinhold Durnthaler (Sometimes spelled as Reinhold Dumthaler) (29 November 1942 – 23 October 2017) was an Austrian bobsledder who competed in the 1960s. He won two silver medals in the four-man event at the 1964 and 1968 Winter Olympics.

Durnthaler also won two medals at the FIBT World Championships with gold in the two-man event in 1967 and a bronze in the four-man event in 1963.

References

 Bobsleigh four-man Olympic medalists for 1924, 1932-56, and since 1964
 Bobsleigh two-man world championship medalists since 1931
 Bobsleigh four-man world championship medalists since 1930
 DatabaseOlympics.com profile

1942 births
2017 deaths
Austrian male bobsledders
Bobsledders at the 1964 Winter Olympics
Bobsledders at the 1968 Winter Olympics
Olympic bobsledders of Austria
Olympic silver medalists for Austria
Olympic medalists in bobsleigh
Medalists at the 1964 Winter Olympics
Medalists at the 1968 Winter Olympics